752 Naval Air Squadron (752 NAS) was a Naval Air Squadron of the Royal Navy's Fleet Air Arm. Formed in 1939, it was active through to 1945 as an Observer Training Squadron, part of No.1 Observer School, and from 1940 to disbandment operated at RNAS Piarco (HMS Goshawk), Trinidad.

History of 752 NAS

Observer Training Squadron (1939 - 1945) 

752 Naval Air Squadron formed at RNAS Ford (HMS Perigrine), located at Ford, in West Sussex, England, on 24 May 1939 as an Observer Training Squadron and operated Proctor, a British radio trainer and communications aircraft, and Albacore, a single-engine biplane torpedo bomber aircraft.

On the 18 August 1940, a formation of Junkers Ju 87, or Stuka, dive bombers, attacked RNAS Ford as part of a large Luftwaffe force attacking airfields around Hampshire and Sussex. 28 personnel were killed and 75 wounded in the raid, which also destroyed 17 aircraft, damaged 26 more and caused significant infrastructure damage

The squadron remained at Ford for around one month more, before moving to RNAS Lee-on-Solent (HMS Daedalus), situated near Lee-on-the-Solent in Hampshire, approximately four miles west of Portsmouth, on 30 September 1939.

The squadron's function was the training of observers for the Fleet Air Arm. As well as Proctor and Albacore, 752 NAS also operated Tiger Moth, a British biplane operated as a primary trainer aircraft, here.

The ocean liner and a refrigerated cargo ship, SS Almeda Star, left Liverpool carrying within its passenger complement, 142 members of the Fleet Air Arm to RNAS Piarco. They consisted of 21 officers and 121 ratings from 749 NAS, 750 NAS and 752 NAS. All 360 people aboard were lost.

752 NAS operated from RNAS Piarco for the remainder of World War II, finally disbanding there on the 9 October 1945.

Aircraft flown 

752 Naval Air Squadron has flown a number of different aircraft types, including:
Percival Proctor
Fairey Albacore
de Havilland Tiger Moth

Naval Air Stations  

752 Naval Air Squadron operated from a number of naval air stations of the Royal Navy, both in the UK and overseas:
Royal Naval Air Station FORD (24 May 1939 - 30 September 1939)
Royal Naval Air Station LEE-ON-SOLENT (30 September 1939 - 5 November 1940)
Royal Naval Air Station PIARCO (5 November 1940 - 9 October 1945)

Commanding Officers 

List of commanding officers of 752 Naval Air Squadron with month and year of appointment and end:

Lt-Cdr G.R.F.T. Cooper RN (May 1939-Feb 1940)
Lt-Cdr J. H. Mc I Malcom, RNVR (Feb 1940-Mar 1941)
Lt-Cdr B. A. G. Meads, RNVR (Mar 1941-May 1943)
Lt-Cdr G. M. Tonge, RNVR (May 1943-May 1945)
Lt-Cdr P. G. Lee, RNVR (May 1945-Oct 1945)

References

Citations

Bibliography

700 series Fleet Air Arm squadrons
Military units and formations established in 1939
Military units and formations of the Royal Navy in World War II